Delta may refer to:
 SARS-CoV-2 Delta variant
Hepatitis D